Tammreddy Bharadwaja is an Indian film director and producer who works in Telugu cinema. Bharadwaja directed over 20 films and produced around 10 films in his career. He also served as the president of the APFCC (Andhra Pradesh Film Chamber of Commerce). He is known for his role as a liaison between Telugu film producers and film workers unions. He is the son of Tammareddy Krishna Murthy, a veteran film producer who received the Raghupathi Venkaiah Award.

Bharadwaja started his film career as a producer with Kothala Rayudu (1979). His second film was Mogudu Kavali (1980). Both of them starred Chiranjeevi and were commercially successful. He later turned a director and made successful films like Alajadi (1989), Pachani Samsaram (1993), Swarnakka (1998). In 2006, he directed Pothe Poni which won the Nandi Award for Best Feature Film - Gold.

Early life
Tammreddy Bharadwaja is born in a film family. His father, Tammareddy Krishna Murthy is a film producer who received the Raghupathi Venkaiah Award. His brother Lenin Babu is also a film director.

Since his childhood, Bharadwaja was interested in labour problems. His father was a communist. Bharadwaja was a union member in Students' Union Federation. Due to these reasons, he was attracted towards labour union problems. Later on in his career, this made him useful as a liaison between Telugu film producers and film workers' unions.

Bharadwaja did his schooling in Wesley High School, Secunderabad. He later did his B. E. in the College of Engineering, Osmania University.

Career 
Bharadwaja pursued a career as a Civil Engineer in Andhra Pradesh's irrigation department and also had a brief stint at Hyderabad municipal corporation. He then stepped into film industry in 1979 as a producer and later became a director.

Bharadwaja started a film production company, Charita Chitra named after his daughter. His first film as a producer was Kothala Rayudu (1979). It was also the first film for Chiranjeevi as a full-fledged solo lead. His second film was Mogudu Kavali (1980) also starring Chiranjeevi. Kothala Rayudu ran for 100 days film and Mogudu Kavali ran for 175 days.

Bharadwaja debuted as a director with Manmatha Samrajyam (1989) starring Malasri. His second film as a director was Alajadi (1989), which was commercially successful. Then he directed more films in the next few years, out of which Pachani Samsaram (1993) was a box-office hit.

In 1995, he produced and directed Vetagadu, a remake of Hindi film Baazigar (1993). The film was a major financial set back for Bharadwaja. After the failure of Vetagadu, he closed his office and quit the film industry. His even went abroad to settle down. He came back and changed his banner name to Ravindra Arts, which was his father's banner. He produced and directed Swarnakka (1998) on that banner which became successful.

Bharadwaja produced Suri in 2000 which became a box-ofifce disaster. As per Bharadwaja, for Suri, he even lacked the money to put the movie titles or market the film in newspapers. His next directorial film Ramma Chilakamma (2001) starred Sumanth and Laya and was a box-office failure. His 2006 directorial venture, Pothe Poni was critically acclaimed and won the Nandi Award for Best Feature Film - Gold.

Filmography

Actor
 Ee Rojullo (2012) as himself
 Nenera Police (1991) as Villain

 As distributor
Palasa 1978 (2020)

References

External links
Tammareddy Bharadwaj
 

Film producers from Andhra Pradesh
Telugu film directors
Telugu film producers
1948 births
Living people
Film directors from Andhra Pradesh
20th-century Indian film directors